The Quarter Century Wireless Association, Inc. (QCWA) is an organization of licensed amateur radio operators who were first licensed at least 25 years ago. It is not required that licensing have been continuous during that period. The organization was started in 1947, and had 54 charter members at the end of that year. Its headquarters is located in the United States. There are 230 Charted Chapters located world-wide.

It was first mentioned in the May 14, 2015 minutes of the Annual Board of Directors meeting, which is available on the Members Only Web page. This is an excerpt from the minutes. “A motion was made by Director Beals and Seconded by Director Varounis to authorize the use of “47” as the official QCWA signoff to signify friendship and cooperation between QCWA members. The motion carried by unanimous vote. Since QCWA was founded on December 5, 1947, the use of ‘47’ seemed like a good idea. Now you know the rest of the story."

References

External links
QCWA Web Site
 QCWA Facebook Page
 QCWA Twitter Page

Amateur radio organizations